St. Mary's Cathedral, St. Mary Cathedral, Cathedral of St. Mary the Virgin and similar may refer to:

Australia
 St Mary's Star of the Sea Cathedral, Darwin
 St Mary's Cathedral, Hobart
 St Mary's Cathedral, Sydney
 St Mary's Cathedral, Perth

Bangladesh
 St. Mary’s Cathedral, Dhaka

Canada
 St. Mary's Cathedral, Calgary
 St. Mary's Cathedral, Kingston
 St. Mary's Cathedral, Winnipeg

Estonia
 St Mary's Cathedral of Tallinn

Germany

 St. Mary's Cathedral (Hamburg)
 New St. Mary's Cathedral (Hamburg)
 St. Mary's Cathedral, Hildesheim

Gibraltar
 Cathedral of St. Mary the Crowned

India

Catholic
St. Mary's Cathedral, Jammu
St. Mary's Cathedral, Jalandhar
St. Mary of the Angels Co-Cathedral, Madras
St. Mary's Cathedral, Ranchi
St. Mary's Cathedral, Punalur
St. Mary's Syro-Malabar Catholic Cathedral Basilica, Ernakulam
St Mary's Metropolitan Cathedral, Changanassery
St. Mary's Cathedral, Pattom, Trivandrum
St. Mary, Queen of Peace Basilica, former cathedral, Trivandrum

Oriental Orthodox
 Manarcad church, also called St. Mary's Cathedral, Manarcaud, Kerala

Indonesia
 St. Mary's Cathedral, Samarinda

Ireland

Catholic
 St. Mary's Cathedral, Cork (Cathedral of St Mary and St Anne)
 St Mary's Pro-Cathedral, Dublin
 St Mary's Cathedral, Kilkenny
 St Mary's Cathedral, Killarney

Church of Ireland
 St. Mary's Cathedral, Limerick
 St Mary's Cathedral, Tuam

Italy
 Florence Cathedral, officially the Cattedrale di Santa Maria del Fiore (Cathedral of Saint Mary of the Flower)
 Cathedral of Our Lady of the Snows, Nuoro, Sardinia

Japan
 St. Mary's Cathedral, Tokyo

Latvia
 Cathedral of the Immaculate Virgin Mary, Jelgava

Lesotho
 Cathedral of St. Mary and St. James, Maseru, seat of the Anglican Diocese of Lesotho

Malaysia
 St. Mary's Cathedral, Kuala Lumpur
 St. Mary's Cathedral, Sandakan

Myanmar
 Saint Mary's Cathedral, Yangon

Namibia
 St. Mary's Cathedral, Windhoek
 St. Mary's Cathedral, Rundu

New Zealand 
 St Mary's Cathedral, Auckland

Pakistan 
 St Mary's Cathedral, Multan, see Multan Cantt#Churches

Poland
 St. Mary's Cathedral, Gorzów Wielkopolski

Serbia
 Cathedral of the Blessed Virgin Mary, Belgrade

South Africa
 St Mary's Cathedral, Johannesburg
 St. Mary the Virgin, Port Elizabeth
 St. Mary our Lady of the Flight into Egypt, Cape Town

Spain
 Cathedral of Toledo, St. Mary's Cathedral in Toledo 
 Burgos Cathedral, St. Mary's Cathedral in Burgos
 León Cathedral, St. Mary's Cathedral, León, Spain
 St. Mary's Cathedral, Astorga, Spain (León (province)) 
 St. Mary's Cathedral ("Old Cathedral"), in Salamanca 
 St. Mary's Cathedral, in Ciudad Rodrigo (province of Salamanca) 
 St. Mary's Cathedral, in Segovia 
 Girona's Cathedral, St. Mary's Cathedral, in Girona
 St. Mary's Cathedral ("Seu Vella"), in Lleida
 St. Mary's Cathedral, in Lugo
 Cathedral of Murcia, St. Mary's Cathedral, in Murcia
 Cathedral of Santa Maria d'Urgell, La Seu d'Urgell

Sri Lanka
 St. Mary's Cathedral, Batticaloa
 St. Mary's Cathedral, Galle
 St. Mary's Cathedral, Jaffna

United Kingdom

England
 Lincoln Cathedral, St. Mary's Cathedral, Lincoln
 St Mary's Cathedral, Newcastle upon Tyne
 St Mary's Cathedral, London. Also known as St Mary's Greek Orthodox Church
 Middlesbrough Cathedral, St. Mary's Cathedral, Middlesbrough
 Truro Cathedral, St. Mary the Virgin

Scotland
 St Mary's Cathedral, Aberdeen 
 St Mary's Cathedral, Edinburgh (Episcopal)
 St Mary's Cathedral, Edinburgh (Roman Catholic)
 St Mary's Cathedral, Glasgow

Wales
 Wrexham Cathedral, St. Mary's Cathedral, Wrexham

United States
California
 Cathedral of Our Lady of the Angels, Los Angeles
 Cathedral of Saint Mary of the Assumption (San Francisco, California)

Colorado
St. Mary's Cathedral (Colorado Springs)

Florida
 Cathedral of Saint Mary (Miami)

Illinois
 Cathedral of Saint Mary of the Immaculate Conception (Peoria, Illinois)

Indiana
 Cathedral of Saint Mary of the Immaculate Conception (Lafayette, Indiana)

Kentucky
 Cathedral Basilica of the Assumption (Covington, Kentucky)

Massachusetts
St. Mary's Cathedral and Rectory (Fall River, Massachusetts), NRHP-listed

Michigan
 St. Mary, Our Lady of Mount Carmel Cathedral (Gaylord, Michigan)
 St. Mary Cathedral (Lansing, Michigan), NRHP-listed
 Cathedral of Mary of the Assumption (Saginaw, Michigan)

Minnesota
 Cathedral of Saint Mary (St. Cloud, Minnesota)
 St. Mary's Orthodox Cathedral (Minneapolis) in Northeast, Minneapolis
 Basilica of Saint Mary (Minneapolis), Co-cathedral

Missouri
 Cathedral of St. Mary of the Annunciation (Cape Girardeau, Missouri)

New Jersey
 Cathedral of St. Mary of the Assumption (Trenton, New Jersey)

New York
 St. Mary's Cathedral (Ogdensburg, New York)

North Dakota
Cathedral of St. Mary (Fargo, North Dakota)

Oregon
 St. Mary's Cathedral (Portland, Oregon)

Tennessee
 St. Mary's Episcopal Cathedral (Memphis, Tennessee)

Texas
 St. Mary's Cathedral (Amarillo, Texas)
 Cathedral of Saint Mary (Austin, Texas)
 St. Mary Cathedral Basilica (Galveston, Texas)

Wyoming
St. Mary's Catholic Cathedral (Cheyenne, Wyoming), listed on the NRHP in Laramie County, Wyoming

See also
Cathedral of Saint Mary of the Assumption (disambiguation)
 St. Mary's Church (disambiguation)